Ooberman are an English band with strong indie, folk and progressive influences first formed in 1997. They split up in 2003, shortly after the release of their second album Hey Petrunko, but announced their reformation in April 2006 and began releasing music again soon thereafter.

History

Early years
Ooberman founders Dan Popplewell and Andy Flett met over a piano at their school in Bradford, 1988. The first band they set up was The Forestry Commission, with Flett's younger brother, Steve on bass guitar. The band's life soon ended when Popplewell moved to Liverpool, but the three friends kept in touch.

Steve Flett moved to Liverpool in 1992, and Andy Flett later joined him in 1996/7, after commuting back and forth from Birmingham where he was studying. Ooberman was then born, complete with Alan Kelly (Drums) and last member Sophia Churney (keyboards and vocals). The first Ooberman gig was in June 1997, and their eccentric live shows and quirky demos won them the 1997 BT Merseyside Arts Award for Best Newcomers.

Their first release was the "Sugar Bum" 7" inch single on Graham Coxon's Transcopic record label, followed by the critically acclaimed "Shorley Wall" EP on Tugboat Records. The band then secured up a major recording contract with Independiente, on which they released their first proper single: the Top 40 hit "Blossoms Falling".

The Magic Treehouse
By Spring 1999, the band had finished work on their debut album, The Magic Treehouse. The album got generally positive reviews, including an 8/10 in NME. The reviews, however, did not translate into sales and after a handful of singles missed the Top 40, Independiente and Ooberman parted company, as did their publishing and management companies further down the line.

The band (or rather Danny and Sophie) had reportedly had enough with the music industry by this time, but in mid-2000, they (or Rather Danny) started work on their second album. During this time, tension within band members caused the original drummer (Alan) to leave the band, to be replaced by Paul Walsham.

Hey Petrunko
After more than a year working on new material, the band announced that they would release their second album – Hey Petrunko – at the start of 2002. A mini-album, Running Girl, preceded it in October 2001. As well as getting another new drummer – Jaymie Ireland, Popplewell also set up his own record label, Rotodisc.

A five track EP – "Bluebell Morning" – and a single – "Beany Bean" – followed, but Hey Petrunko was delayed. After nearly three years working on the album, it was finally released on 3 March 2003, to some critical acclaim.

A tour and another single followed, but the pressure of making Hey Petrunko strained the band, and in May, Popplewell announced that he and Churney were leaving the band. Rotodisc was shut down, and planned releases and tour dates (including festivals and foreign gigs) were scrapped.

Reformation
In February 2005, a website – ooberman.net – was launched, claiming to be "the new official Ooberman website". The website had an image, quite distinctly an album cover, entitled "Ooberman – Rare Recordings". Nothing further was heard from the website until December 2005 when Popplewell stated that the new album would be a mix of old, unreleased and new songs.

However, in April 2006, the ooberman.net site appeared in full, and a news update dated 20 April stated that "the band have now reformed and recorded a new album... there are no current plans to play live."

An album, entitled Carried Away was released in August 2006 by Rotodisc, distributed in the UK by Cargo Records. The release was preceded by an extremely limited 7" single, "The Beauty of Your Soul", on 19 June, and a download-only single – also entitled "Carried Away" – on 24 July that received radio airplay on stations including XFM and 6music, and prominently on Mark Radcliffe's BBC Radio 2 show.

Diversification
In December 2006, Rotodisc released an album by Symphonika entitled The Snow Queen. Symphonika is an orchestral side-project by Dan Popplewell, and the album featured the Royal Liverpool Philharmonic Orchestra and vocals by Sophia Churney.

On 26 February 2007, Andy and Steve Flett released an album of material recorded during Ooberman's time apart under the name Ooberon. It was entitled Waiting for the Sonic Boom.

In September 2007 the band released The Lost Tapes – Rare Recordings 1991–2007, a collection of rare and unreleased recordings covering the period in the title.

The Magic Theatre
On 7 June 2010, a new album London Town featuring Ooberman members Sophia Churney and Dan Popplewell as "The Magic Theatre" was released accompanied by eleven free HD videos. The album's orchestral sound was achieved on a low budget by Popplewell writing library music, designed to be used as background for films and television, that fitted his songs, and re-using the recordings with new vocals by him and Sophia Churney.

Discography
Many of the band's releases have been issued on their own label, Rotodisc.

Albums
1999 The Magic Treehouse
2001 Running Girl (mini album)
2003 Hey Petrunko
2006 Carried Away
2007 The Lost Tapes – Rare Recordings 1991–2007

Singles and EPs
1998 "Sugar Bum"
1998 "Shorley Wall EP"
1999 "Blossoms Falling"
1999 "Million Suns"
1999 "Tears from a Willow"
2000 "Shorley Wall"
2000 "Dolphin Blue"
2001 "Running Girl"
2002 "Bluebell Morning EP"
2002 "Beany Bean"  UK #79
2003 "First Day of the Holidays"
2006 "The Beauty of Your Soul"
2006 "Carried Away" (download only)
2006 "Crashing Ellipticals" (download only)

References

External links
Official website – Ooberman's new official website, with details of the new album
The Magic Treehouse – Long-running unofficial website with news, discography and song information
The Oobtube – Ooberman forum
Ooberman on MySpace – Officially endorsed MySpace page with audio streams

English indie rock groups
Musical groups from Liverpool
Independiente Records artists
Rough Trade Records artists